Daniele Righi (born 28 March 1976, in Colle Val d'Elsa) is an Italian former professional road bicycle racer, who competed as a professional between 2000 and 2012.

References

External links 
 

1976 births
Living people
People from Colle di Val d'Elsa
Italian male cyclists
Sportspeople from the Province of Siena
Cyclists from Tuscany